Baltimore Sportif Club is a professional football club based in Saint-Marc, Haiti.

They have consistently been one of the best clubs in the league. In 2006, it captured the double after winning the league and the Coupe d'Haïti.

They hold a fierce rivalry with local club Tempête FC.

Honours
Ligue Haïtienne: 4
2005 F, 2006 O, 2007 O, 2011 O.

Coupe d'Haïti: 1
2006.

Super 8: 1
2006.

Trophée des Champions d'Haïti: 1
2007.

International competitions
CFU Club Championship: 2 appearances
2006 – Quarter-Finals – Lost against  San Juan Jabloteh 2–0
2012 – Advanced to second round with win against  Bayamón 2–0; draw against  Victory 1–1; withdrew due to being denied visas into the Cayman Islands

References

Football clubs in Haiti
Association football clubs established in 1974
1974 establishments in Haiti